The following is a bibliography of Henry Miller by category.

Books and collections
 Tropic of Cancer, Paris: Obelisk Press, 1934.
 New York: Grove Press, 1961. 
 Black Spring, Paris: Obelisk Press, 1936.
 New York: Grove Press, 1963. 
 Tropic of Capricorn, Paris: Obelisk Press, 1939.
 New York: Grove Press, 1961. 
 The Cosmological Eye, Norfolk, CT: New Directions, 1939. 
 The Colossus of Maroussi, San Francisco: Colt Press, 1941.
 New York: New Directions, 1958. 
 The Wisdom of the Heart, Norfolk, CT: New Directions, 1941.
 New York: New Directions, 1960. 
 Sunday After the War, Norfolk, CT: New Directions, 1944.
 The Air-Conditioned Nightmare, New York: New Directions, 1945.
 New York: New Directions, 1970. 
 Why Abstract? with Hilaire Hiler and William Saroyan, New York: New Directions, 1945.
 New York: Haskell House, 1974. 
 The Time of the Assassins: A Study of Rimbaud, New York: New Directions, 1946.
 New York: New Directions, 1962. 
 Remember to Remember, New York: New Directions, 1947. (Volume 2 of The Air-Conditioned Nightmare.)
 London: Grey Walls Press, 1952.
 The Smile at the Foot of the Ladder, New York: Duell, Sloan and Pearce, 1948.
 Kansas City, MO: Hallmark Editions, 1971. 
 Sexus (Book one of The Rosy Crucifixion), Paris: Obelisk Press, 1949.
 New York: Grove Press, 1963. 
 The Books in My Life, Norfolk, CT: New Directions, 1952.
 New York: New Directions, 1969. 
 Plexus (Book two of The Rosy Crucifixion), Paris: Olympia Press, 1953.
 New York: Grove Press, 1963. 
 Nights of Love and Laughter, Signet, 1955.
 Quiet Days in Clichy, with photographs by Brassaï, Paris: Olympia Press, 1956.
 New York: Grove Press, 1987. 
 Richmond, England: Oneworld Classics, 2007. 
 A Devil in Paradise, New York: New American Library, 1956.
 New York: New Directions, 1993. 
 Big Sur and the Oranges of Hieronymus Bosch, New York: New Directions, 1957. 
 The Henry Miller Reader, ed. Lawrence Durrell, New York: New Directions, 1959.
 Nexus (Book three of The Rosy Crucifixion), Paris: Obelisk Press, 1960.
 New York: Grove Press, 1965. 
 Stand Still Like the Hummingbird, New York: New Directions, 1962. 
 Henry Miller on Writing, New York: New Directions, 1964. 
 Insomnia or the Devil at Large, Albuquerque: Loujon Press, 1970.
 Garden City, NY: Doubleday, 1974.
 My Life and Times, New York: Playboy Press, 1971.
 The Nightmare Notebook, New York: New Directions, 1975. Notes and drawings.
 Henry Miller's Book of Friends: A Tribute to Friends of Long Ago, Santa Barbara, CA: Capra Press, 1976. 
 The World of Lawrence: A Passionate Appreciation, Santa Barbara: Capra Press, 1980.
 Sextet, Santa Barbara, CA: Capra Press, 1977. 
New York: New Directions, 2010. 
 My Bike and Other Friends, Volume II, Book of Friends, Santa Barbara, CA: Capra Press, 1978. 
 Joey: A Loving Portrait of Alfred Perlès Together With Some Bizarre Episodes Relating to the Opposite Sex, Volume III, Book of Friends, Santa Barbara, CA: Capra Press, 1979.

Pamphlets and small print runs
 Aller Retour New York, Paris: Obelisk Press, 1935.
 What Are You Going to Do about Alf? An Open Letter to All and Sundry, Paris: Pamphlet printed at author's expense, 1935.
 London: Turret, 1971. 
 Max and the White Phagocytes, Paris: Obelisk Press, 1938.
 New York: New Directions, 1991. 
 The World of Sex, Chicago: Ben Abramson, Argus Book Shop, 1940.
 Richmond, England: Oneworld Classics, 2007. 
 The Plight of the Creative Artist in the United States of America, ?:? [no publisher listed, but published by Bern Porter], [undated, internal evidence suggests 1944].
 Echolalia: Reproductions of Water Colors, Berkeley, CA: Bern Porter, 1945.
 Henry Miller Miscellanea, San Mateo, CA: Bern Porter, 1945.
 Maurizius Forever, San Francisco: Colt Press, 1946.
 Into the Night Life, privately published with Bezalel Schatz, 1947.
 The Waters Reglitterized: The Subject of Water Color in Some of Its More Liquid Phases, San Jose, CA: John Kidis, 1950.
 Santa Barbara, CA: Capra Press, 1973. 
 The Red Notebook, Highlands, NC: Jargon Books, 1958. Facsimile of one of Miller's journals from 1939.
 To Paint is to Love Again, Alhambra, CA: Cambria Books, 1960.
 New York: Grossman Publishers, 1968.
 Watercolors, Drawings, and His Essay "The Angel Is My Watermark", New York: Abrams, 1962.
 Greece (with drawings by Anne Poor), New York: Viking Press, 1964.
 On Turning Eighty, Santa Barbara, CA: Capra Press, 1972. , 9780912264431
The Immortal Bard, London: Village Press, 1973. (About John Cowper Powys, print run of 500 copies.)
 First Impressions of Greece, Santa Barbara, CA: Capra Press, 1973. 
 Reflections on the Maurizius Case: A Humble Appraisal of a Great Book, Santa Barbara, CA: Capra Press, 1974.

Plays
 Just Wild About Harry, New York: New Directions, 1963.
 New York: New Directions, 1979.

Correspondence
 Hamlet Volume I with Michael Fraenkel, New York: Carrefour, 1939.
 Hamlet Volume II with Michael Fraenkel, New York: Carrefour, 1941.
 Above two volumes republished, minus two letters, as Henry Miller's Hamlet Letters, Santa Barbara, CA: Capra Press, 1988. 
 Letters to Anaïs Nin, 1965.
 The Plight of the Creative Artist in the United States of America, Houlton, ME: Bern Porter, 1944.
 Semblance of a Devoted Past, Berkeley, CA: Bern Porter, 1944. A collection of Miller’s letters to Emil Schnellock.
 Reunion in Barcelona: a Letter to Alfred Perlès, from Aller Retour New York, Northwood, England: Scorpion Press, 1959.
 Lawrence Durrell and Henry Miller: A Private Correspondence, ed. George Wickes, E.P. Dutton, 1963.
 A Literate Passion: Letters of Anaïs Nin and Henry Miller, 1932-1953, ed. Gunther Stuhlmann. San Diego: Harcourt Brace Jovanovich, 1987.
 The Durrell-Miller Letters, 1935-80, ed. Ian S. MacNiven, New York: New Directions, 1988.
 From Your Capricorn Friend: Henry Miller and the Stroker, 1978-1980, New York: New Directions, 1984. Correspondence with Irving Stettner.
 Letters to Emil, New York: New Directions, 1989. A collection of Miller’s letters to Emil Schnellock, from 1921-34.
 Proteus and the Magician: The Letters of Henry Miller and John Cowper Powys, ed. Jacqueline Peltier. London: The Powys Society, 2014.

Posthumous publications
 Moloch: or, This Gentile World, written in 1927, published by the Estate of Henry Miller. New York: Grove Press, 1992. 
 Crazy Cock (originally titled Lovely Lesbians), written in 1928–30, published by the Estate of Henry Miller. New York: Grove Weidenfeld, 1991. 
 Opus Pistorum, (from the Latin, Work of the Miller), written as pornography-for-hire in 1941 (see Anaïs Nin), was retitled in its second edition Under the Roofs of Paris, published by the Estate of Henry Miller. New York: Grove Press, 1983. 
 Paris 1928 (Nexus II), abandoned continuation of Nexus, written in 1961, published by Bloomington: Indiana University Press, 2012.
 Into the Heart of Life: Henry Miller at One Hundred, ed. Frederick Turner, New York: New Directions, 1991.

Unpublished work
 Clipped Wings, Miller's first novel, written in 1922.

Discography
 Henry Miller Recalls and Reflects: An Extraordinary American Writer Speaks Out (2 LP records, RLP 7002/3), New York: Riverside Records, 1956.

References
 Mary V. Dearborn, The Happiest Man Alive: A Biography of Henry Miller, New York: Simon & Schuster, 1991.
 Robert Ferguson, Henry Miller: A Life, New York: W. W. Norton & Company, 1991.
 Arthur Hoyle, The Unknown Henry Miller: A Seeker in Big Sur, New York: Arcade Publishing, 2014. 

Bibliography
Bibliographies of American writers